Ephialtias bryce is a moth of the  family Notodontidae. It is endemic to the basin of the Rio Tapajos in Brazil.

References

External links
Species page at Tree of Life project

Notodontidae of South America
Endemic fauna of Brazil
Moths described in 1854